Acacia crispula is a shrub belonging to the genus Acacia and the subgenus Phyllodineae that is native to southern parts of Western Australia.

Description
It blooms from September to December and produces cream-yellow flowers.

Taxonomy
The species was first formally described by the botanist George Bentham in 1855 as part of the work Plantae Muellerianae: Mimoseae as published journal Linnaea: ein Journal für die Botanik in ihrem ganzen Umfange, oder Beiträge zur Pflanzenkunde. It was reclassified as Racosperma crispulum in 2003 by Leslie Pedley and transferred back to the genus Acacia in 2006.

Distribution
It is native to an area along the south coast in the Goldfields-Esperance and Great Southern regions of Western Australia where it grows in sandy, clay, loamy and gravelly soils.  The range of the bulk of the population of the plant is between Cranbrook to Cape Arid National Park with some outlying populations. It usually as a part of mallee shrubland communities but also among heath, low scrub and open wandoo woodlands.

See also
List of Acacia species

References

crispula
Acacias of Western Australia
Plants described in 1855
Taxa named by George Bentham